Future-Worm! is an American comic science fiction animated television series created by Ryan Quincy, who previously created IFC's Out There, for Disney XD. The show features the adventures of Danny and Future-Worm, who time travel by using a lunch box-shaped time machine.

After a series of shorts, the full show premiered on August 1, 2016 and ended on May 19, 2018.

On June 29, 2018, Disney XD announced the cancellation of Future-Worm! after one season.

Plot 
The show follows Danny Douglas, a 13-year-old boy who, after inventing a time machine lunch box, sends it back in time. However, it was knocked out into the future as future scientists discover it. Because of its small size, the scientists use a worm and transform it into Future-Worm, a worm with a Photo Receptor Visor, Titanium Reinforced Abs and a Bullet-Proof Beard. He travels back to Danny's timeline as the boy meets the worm, and agrees to befriend him. Danny's life eventually changes forever as he has the coolest adventures, head into the past, present and future, meet new recruits, and seek the help of their friend Bug.

Characters

Main  
 Danny Douglas (voiced by Andy Milonakis) – A boy who invents the Time Machine Lunch Box. He joins Future-Worm on many adventures.
 Future-Worm (voiced by James Adomian) – A futuristic worm (nicknamed Fyootch) who has a photo receptor visor, titanium reinforced abs, and a bullet-proof beard. Future-Worm is Danny's best friend, and the worm helps out on Danny's quests.
 Bug (voiced by Jessica DiCicco) – A purple-haired girl with wings.
 Robo-Carp (voiced by Ryan Quincy) – A fish-shaped robot who, every time Danny uses him, only explodes thus making him useless.

Recurring 
 Doug Douglas (voiced by Ryan Quincy) – Danny's father.
 Megan Douglas (voiced by Melanie Lynskey) – Danny's mother.
 Steak Starbolt (voiced by Jonathan Frakes) – The star of his own show who is also Danny's favorite hero.
 Narrator (voiced by Corey Burton) – The unseen narrator who narrates the show and even names the different devices that Danny and Future-Worm use.
 Future Danny (voiced by Paul Williams) – Danny's older future self.
Neil deGrasse Tyson (voiced by himself) – The guy who knows everything about science, who is also telepathic.
 Madeline – A time traveling girl from the Victorian past.

Villains 
 Gloopies – Spineless alien creatures who loathe Captain Cakerz. Their weakness is the crunch of the cereal.
 Anchovy Monster – A monstrous anchovy who seeks revenge on Future-Worm, who betrayed it due to the fact that he dislikes anchovies.

Production 
The characters first appeared in Disney XD's 2015 lineup. A series of shorts premiered later that same year.

Disney originally greenlighted the show to premiere somewhere in the fall of 2015, but Pickle and Peanut placed its debut following its official premiere on September 2, 2015, pushing Future-Worm! to premiere on August 1, 2016.

The series was created by Ryan Quincy, who previously created the short-lived animated series Out There on IFC, and was a former animation director for South Park.

Animation was provided by Titmouse, Inc., who also made other Disney XD shows: Motorcity, Randy Cunningham: 9th Grade Ninja and, for the animation for animated characters, Kirby Buckets.

Episodes

Series overview

Shorts (2015)

Series (2016–18) 
 Episodes are usually 22 minutes long: the first segment is eleven minutes long, the second segment runs three minutes, and the third runs seven minutes.

References

External links 
 Official website
 

2016 American television series debuts
2018 American television series endings
2010s American animated television series
2010s American comic science fiction television series
2010s American time travel television series
American children's animated adventure television series
American children's animated comic science fiction television series
American flash animated television series
Disney XD original programming
English-language television shows
Fictional worms
Television series by Disney Television Animation
Television series by Disney–ABC Domestic Television
Television series created by Ryan Quincy